Guangdong Romanization refers to the four romanization schemes published by the Guangdong Provincial Education Department in 1960 for transliterating Cantonese, Teochew, Hakka and Hainanese. The schemes utilized similar elements with some differences in order to adapt to their respective spoken varieties.

In certain respects, Guangdong romanization resembles pinyin in its distinction of the alveolar initials z, c, s from the alveolo-palatal initials j, q, x and in its use of b, d, g to represent the unaspirated stop consonants .  In addition, it makes use of the medial u before the rime rather than representing it as w in the initial when it follows g or k.

Guangdong romanization makes use of diacritics to represent certain vowels.  This includes the use of the circumflex, acute accent and diaeresis in the letters ê, é and ü, respectively.  In addition, it uses -b, -d, -g to represent the coda consonants  rather than -p, -t, -k like other romanization schemes in order to be consistent with their use as unaspirated plosives in the initial. Tones are marked by superscript numbers rather than by diacritics.

Cantonese

The scheme for Cantonese is outlined in "The Cantonese Transliteration Scheme".  It is referred to as the Canton Romanization on the LSHK character database.  The system is not used in Hong Kong where romanization schemes such as Hong Kong Government, Yale, Cantonese Pinyin and Jyutping are popular, though it can be seen in works released in the People's Republic of China regarding Cantonese.

Teochew

The scheme for the Teochew dialect of Min Nan is outlined in "The Teochew Transliteration Scheme".  This scheme (and another similar scheme which is based upon this scheme) is often referred to as Peng'im, which is the Teochew pronunciation of pinyin.

This scheme is the romanization scheme currently described in the Teochew dialect article.

Hakka

The scheme for Hakka is outlined in "The Hakka Transliteration Scheme". The scheme describes the Meixian dialect, which is generally regarded as the de facto standard dialect of Hakka in mainland China.

Hainanese

The scheme for Hainanese is outlined in the "Hainanese Transliteration Scheme". The scheme describes the Wenchang dialect, which is generally regarded as the prestige dialect of Hainanese in mainland China, used in provincial broadcasting.

External links
 Cukda Cantonese IME
 廣州話拼音方案 - GuangZhou Dialect (Cantonese) Romanization Scheme 
 潮州話拼音方案 - ChaoZhou Dialect Romanization Scheme 
 梅縣話拼音方案 - Meixian Dialect ( 客家 / Kejia / Hakka ) Romanization Scheme 
 海南话拼音文字方案 - The Hainanese Transliteration Scheme

References
 

Cantonese romanisation
Hakka Chinese
Southern Min
Chaoshan
Hainan Min